
Gmina Torzym is an urban-rural gmina (administrative district) in Sulęcin County, Lubusz Voivodeship, in western Poland.

Villages
Apart from the town of Torzym, Gmina Torzym contains the villages and settlements of Bargów, Bielice, Bobrówko, Boczów, Debrznica, Drzewce, Drzewce-Kolonia, Gądków Mały, Gądków Wielki, Garbicz, Grabów, Jelenie Pole, Koryta, Kownaty, Lubin, Lubów, Mierczany, Pniów, Prześlice, Rojek, Rożnówka, Tarnawa Rzepińska, Walewice and Wystok.

Neighbouring gminas
Gmina Torzym is bordered by the gminas of Bytnica, Cybinka, Łagów, Maszewo, Ośno Lubuskie, Rzepin and Sulęcin.

Twin towns – sister cities

Gmina Torzym is twinned with:
 Kolkwitz, Germany

References

Torzym
Sulęcin County